The State Ballet of Georgia is the ballet company of the Z. Paliashvilil Opera and Ballet State Theatre in Tbilisi . Nina Ananiashvili has been artistic director since 2004. Its repertory includes works by Ashton, Balanchine, Bournonville, Kylián, Ratmansky, Possokhov, McIntyre and Welch. The company has toured to New York City in 2007, 2008, 2010 and 2011, to Jacob's Pillow, and to Edinburgh.

Avery Fisher Hall, November 2011
  
 Charms of Mannerism 
 
 Nina Ananiashvili
 Lali Kandelaki
 
 Vasil Akhmeteli 
 William Pratt 

  
 Bizet Variations 
 
 Anna Muradeli
 Ekaterine Surmava
 Ana Albutashvili 
 
 Vasil Akhmeteli 
 David Ananeli 
 Otar Khelashvili 

  
 SWAN 
 
 Nina Ananiashvili
 

  
 Dreams of Japan 
 
 Nina Ananiashvili
 
 the company

Footnotes

Reviews
  
 NY Times, Brian Seiberg, November 6, 2011 
 NY Times, Claudia La Rocco, June 24, 2010 
 
 NY Times, Alastair Macaulay, March 3, 2008
 NY Times, Alastair Macaulay, February 29, 2008 
 Washington Examiner, Marie Gullard, November 10, 2011

External links
Archive footage of Nina Ananiashvili and David Ananeli performing Thaïs Pas de Deux in 2010 at Jacob's Pillow
 
 webpage on Ananiashvili.com
 performance schedule on Ananiashvili.com

Ballet companies
Ballet in Georgia (country)